Collblanc is a station on line 5, line 9 and line 10 of the Barcelona Metro.

The station is located underneath Carretera de Collblanc in L'Hospitalet de Llobregat, between Travessera de les Corts and Carrer Francesc Layret. It was opened in 1969 and served as terminus until the extension to Pubilla Cases station of the L5 in 1973. The name of the station was "San Ramón" (in Spanish) or "Sant Ramon" till the mid 1980s. In February 2016 was opened the L9 station. In September 2018 opened the L10 section.

The L5 is a side platform station and the L9/L10 is a two levels station. It has a ticket hall on either end, the western one with two accesses at Carrer Francesc Layret and Carrer Doctor Martí Julià, the eastern one with one access at San Ramón.

Is the nearest station to the Camp Nou, the stadium of FC Barcelona.

Rail services

See also
List of Barcelona Metro stations
Transport in L'Hospitalet de Llobregat

External links
 Collblanc at Trenscat.com

Railway stations in Spain opened in 1969
Barcelona Metro line 5 stations
Barcelona Metro line 9 stations
Barcelona Metro line 10 stations
Railway stations in L'Hospitalet de Llobregat